Widow at Windsor or Widow of Windsor may refer to:

 Queen Victoria, as a widow at the royal residence at Windsor
 The Widow at Windsor, a poem by Rudyard Kipling, referencing Queen Victoria